Gavin Cattle (born 5 April 1980) is a Welsh former rugby union player, and the current co-coach of the Cornish Pirates along with Alan Paver. As a player, Cattle played as a scrum-half and captained the Cornish Pirates to the 2007 EDF Energy Trophy with a 19–16 win over the Exeter Chiefs at Twickenham Stadium.

External links
Profile at scarlets.co.uk

1980 births
Cornish Pirates players
Living people
Rotherham Titans players
Rugby union scrum-halves
Scarlets players
Welsh rugby union players
Rugby union players from Bridgend